Pawlet is the central village and a census-designated place (CDP) in the town of Pawlet, Rutland County, Vermont, United States. As of the 2020 census, it had a population of 194, out of 1,424 in the entire town.

The CDP is in southwestern Rutland County, at the geographic center of the town of Pawlet. It sits on the west side of the Taconic Mountains, in the valley of the Mettawee River, a northwest-flowing tributary of Lake Champlain.

Vermont Route 30 passes through the village, leading north  to Wells and southeast  to Dorset. Vermont Route 133 has its southern terminus at Route 30 in Pawlet; it leads north  to Middletown Springs.

References 

Populated places in Rutland County, Vermont
Census-designated places in Rutland County, Vermont
Census-designated places in Vermont